Microcosm Ltd is a UK company established in 1979. Its early claims to fame included Silicon Disk System in 1981 and Microcache (the world's first disk cache for microcomputers) in 1982. 

Since 1989, it has concentrated on computer security, firstly with CopyControl (a software-based copy protection system), then Dinkey Dongle (small hardware copy protection keys that connect to parallel or USB ports). In 2005, it produced CopyMinder (software-based copy protection that uses the Internet where possible to provide an 'intelligent' copy protection system). More recently, it has expanded its security products by producing SmartSign, a multi-factor authentication system that supports using mobile devices to control access to web pages.

History
 1979 – Microcosm Limited was established in London (UK)
 1981 – Silicon Disk System (the world's first RAM disk for microcomputers) released
 1982 – Microcache (the world's first disk cache for microcomputers) released
 1989 – CopyControl floppy disk protection released
 1989 – Microcosm moved to Bristol (UK)
 1994 – CopyControl UnLock-It software based protection released
 1995 – Microcosm receives Ziff-Davis Europe award (finalist, best UK product) for CopyControl 1.65
 1995 – Parallel port Dinkey Dongle released
 2000 – USB port Dinkey Dongle released
 2004 – CopyMinder internet-based software protection released
 2008 – The world's first driverless combined Flash Drive and software protection dongle released
 2014 – SmartSign released, providing multi-factor authentication

References

External links
Microcosm Ltd official website
SmartSign official website

Computer companies established in 1979
Computer companies of the United Kingdom
Computer hardware companies
1979 establishments in England
British brands